Waste management encompasses all of the activities and actions required to manage waste from its inception to its final disposal.

Waste management may also refer to:

Waste Management (corporation)
Waste Management (album)

See also